"Mugby Junction" is a set of short stories written in 1866 by Charles Dickens and collaborators Charles Collins, Amelia B. Edwards, Andrew Halliday, and Hesba Stretton. It was first published in a Christmas edition of the magazine All the Year Round. Dickens penned a majority of the issue, including the frame narrative in which "the Gentleman for Nowhere," who has spent his life cloistered in the firm Barbox Brothers & Co., makes use of his new-found freedom in retirement to explore the rail lines that connect with Mugby Junction. Dickens's collaborators each contributed an individual story to the collection.

Overview
Mugby Junction includes the famous ghost story "The Signal-Man" concerning a spectre seen beside a tunnel entrance. The signal-man of the title tells the narrator of a ghost that has been haunting him. Each spectral appearance precedes, and is a harbinger of, a tragic event on the railway on which the signalman works. The signalman's work is at a signalbox in a deep cutting near a tunnel entrance on a lonely stretch of the line, and he controls the movements of passing trains. When there is danger, his fellow signalmen alert him via telegraph and alarms. Three times, he receives phantom warnings of danger when his bell rings in a fashion that only he can hear. Each warning is followed by the appearance of the spectre, and then by a terrible accident.

The first accident involves a terrible collision between two trains in the tunnel. Dickens may have based this incident on the Clayton Tunnel rail crash that occurred in 1861, five years before he wrote the story. Readers in 1866 would have been familiar with this major disaster. The second warning involves the mysterious death of a young woman on a passing train. The final warning is a premonition of the signalman's own death.

Another story features, in a thinly disguised form, the town of Rugby in Warwickshire and the town's railway station. This was inspired by an incident in April 1866, when Charles Dickens was travelling from London to Liverpool. Dickens's train made an unscheduled stop at Rugby due to one of the carriages catching fire. While waiting for his journey to resume, he went into the refreshment room for a cup of coffee, and the proprietess, clearly not recognising the celebrity author, treated him rudely. Inspired by this, in chapter three of 'Mugby Junction' he made a scathing attack on railway refreshment rooms and their staff.

List of stories

References

External links

Online editions
Mugby Junction at Project Gutenburg
Mugby Junction - Easy to read HTML version (Does note include complete text).
 

1866 short stories
Short stories by Charles Dickens
Works originally published in All the Year Round